No. 100 (Bomber Support) Group was a special duties group within RAF Bomber Command. The group was formed on 11 November 1943 to consolidate the increasingly complex business of electronic warfare and countermeasures in one organisation. The group was responsible for the development, operational trial and use of electronic warfare and countermeasures equipment. It was based at RAF stations in East Anglia, chiefly Norfolk.

The group was a pioneer in countering the formidable force of radar-equipped Luftwaffe night fighters, using a range of electronic 'homers' fitted to de Havilland Mosquito fighters which detected night fighter radar and radio emissions and allowed the RAF fighters to home in onto the Axis aircraft and either shoot them down or disrupt their missions against the bomber streams. Other Mosquitoes would patrol around Luftwaffe fighter airfields ready to attack night fighters as they landed.

This constant harassment had a detrimental effect on the morale and confidence of many Luftwaffe crews and indirectly led to a high proportion of aircraft and aircrew wastage from crashes as night fighters hurried in to land to avoid the Mosquito threat (real or imagined).

From 1944–45, the Mosquitos of 100 Group claimed 258 Luftwaffe aircraft shot down for 70 losses. The gradually increasing threat from the RAF fighters also created what the Luftwaffe crews nicknamed Moskito Panik as the night fighter crews were never sure when or where they may come under attack from the marauding 100 Group fighters.

Top Mosquito ace with 100 Group was Wing Commander Branse Burbridge of 85 Squadron, with 21 claims from 1944–45.

The bomber squadrons of 100 Group utilised various specialist electronic jamming devices to disrupt German radio communications and radar. During 100 Group's existence over 32 different devices were evaluated and used. Specially equipped 100 Group aircraft would fly in the bomber stream. Much of this equipment was developed at the Telecommunications Research Establishment (TRE).

Special equipment used included Airborne Cigar (ABC) jammer, Jostle (jammer), Mandrel (jammer), Airborne Grocer (jammer), Piperack (jammer), Perfectos (homer), Serrate (homer), Corona (spoofer), Carpet (jammer)  and  Lucero (homer), used against German equipment such as Lichtenstein, Freya, and Wurzburg radars.

Order of battle

No. 100 Group was headquartered at Bylaugh Hall, Norfolk from January 1944, a central location from which to administer the group's airfields in north Norfolk. No 100 Group operated from eight airfields with approximately 260 aircraft, 140 of which were various marks of Mosquito night fighter intruders with the remainder consisting of Handley Page Halifaxes, Short Stirlings, Vickers Wellingtons, Fortresses and Liberators carrying electronic jamming equipment. The group also operated the Bristol Beaufighter for a short time.

The group disbanded on 17 December 1945. During its existence it had one commander, Air Vice-Marshal Edward Addison.

Other units and stations:
 No. 1692 Flight RAF based at RAF Little Snoring
 No. 1699 Flight RAF based at RAF Oulton to train Fortress crews for 214 Squadron
 No. 100 Group Communications Flight at RAF West Raynham and then RAF Swanton Morley
 No. 80 (Signals) Wing RAF from November 1943 based at Radlett Aerodrome, controlled Meacon beacons and other radio counter measures and intelligence work.

See also
 Light Night Strike Force
 List of World War II electronic warfare equipment
 List of Royal Air Force groups
 36th Bombardment Squadron
 Michael Renaut

References

Citations

Sources 

 Bond, Steve & Forder, Richard Special Ops Liberators 2239Bomber Support0 Squadron, 100 Group and the Electronic War. Grub Street 2011 .
 Bowman, Martin W. 100 Group (Bomber Support): RAF Bomber Command in World War II. Barnsley, South Yorkshire, UK: Pen & Sword/Leo Cooper, 2006. .
 Bowman, Martin W. and Tom Cushing. Confounding the Reich. Barnsley, South Yorkshire, UK: Pen & Sword/Leo Cooper, 2004. .
 
 
 Peden, Murray. A Thousand Shall Fall: the True Story of a Canadian Bomber Pilot in World War Two. Toronto, Ontario, Canada: Stoddart Publishing Co. Ltd., 1988 (reprinted in 2000). .
 Streetly, Martin. Confound & Destroy.  London: Macdonald and Jane's (Publishing) Company Ltd., 1978. .

External links 
 Website RAF 100 Group Association
 Website RAF bomber Command
 Website, RAF 100 Group Museum
 
 "The Illusionists" a 1945 Flight article

Electronic warfare units and formations
Military units and formations established in 1943
100
Telecommunications in World War II